Seville Theatre, also known as the Bryn Mawr Theatre, is a historic theatre building located at Lower Merion Township, Montgomery County, Pennsylvania. It was built in 1926, and is a two-story, three bay wide, rectangular steel frame building in the Beaux-Arts style.  It measures 56 feet wide and 265 feet deep.  It was designed by noted theatre architect William Harold Lee (1884-1971).

It was added to the National Register of Historic Places in 2005.

References

External links

Bryn Mawr Film Institute (BMFI) website

Theatres on the National Register of Historic Places in Pennsylvania
Beaux-Arts architecture in Pennsylvania
Theatres completed in 1926
Buildings and structures in Montgomery County, Pennsylvania
1926 establishments in Pennsylvania
National Register of Historic Places in Montgomery County, Pennsylvania